The episodes of the anime series Phantom Thief Jeanne are based on the manga series of the same name written and illustrated by Arina Tanemura. The anime series is directed by Atsutoshi Umezawa at Toei Animation, written by Sukehiro Tomita, character designed by Hisashi Kagawa with Katsumi Tamegai as chief animation director, and music composed by Michiaki Kato. The first episode premiered in Japan on TV Asahi on February 13, 1999, where it aired for two seasons, comprising 44 episodes, until its conclusion on January 29, 2000.

The series uses four pieces of theme music. For the remaining episodes, the opening theme is "Dive into Shine" by Lastier and "Till The End" by Hibiki is the ending theme.


Episode list

Season 1

Season 2

References

External links
 Official Toei Animation Kamikaze Kaito Jeanne anime site 
 

Phantom Thief Jeanne